Titan yellow is a compound with formula C28H19N5Na2O6S4. It is a triazene dye used as a stain and fluorescent indicator in microscopy. It is also used for the colorimetric indication of various compounds and is an acid-base indicator.  As an acid-base indicator, it changes color from yellow to red between pH 12 and pH 13.

References

Sulfonates
Organic sodium salts
Benzothiazoles
Fluorescent dyes